Stokenchurch BT Tower is a telecommunications tower built of reinforced concrete at Stokenchurch, Buckinghamshire, England. There are four platforms at the top that are used to attach microwave transmission drums and other antennas.

The Stokenchurch Tower is one of the fourteen BT towers built of reinforced concrete. Seven of the fourteen are of similar design, known as the 'Chilterns' type, after this tower's location on the Chiltern Hills. They are identical except for their heights, which vary considerably; the Stokenchurch BT Tower is the second tallest out of the set. The towers are located at:-

See also
 British Telecom microwave network
 Telecommunications towers in the United Kingdom

References

External links

 Photo
 Backbone towers

British Telecom buildings and structures
Buildings and structures in Buckinghamshire
Towers in Buckinghamshire
Chiltern Hills
Transmitter sites in England